Aleksandr Ilyich Akhiezer (October 18, 1911 – May 4, 2000) was a Soviet and Ukrainian theoretical physicist, known for contributions to numerous branches of theoretical physics, including quantum electrodynamics, nuclear physics, solid state physics, quantum field theory, and the theory of plasma. He was the brother of the mathematician Naum Akhiezer.

Biography

Akhiezer was born in Cherykaw, Russian Empire in what is now Mahilyow Voblast, Belarus. He studied radio engineering at Kyiv Polytechnic Institute in 1929–34. From 1934, he worked at the Ukrainian Institute of Physics and Technology in Kharkiv. With Isaak Pomeranchuk and under the supervision of Lev Landau, he studied light-light scattering and was awarded a Ph.D. in 1936.

When Landau left Kharkiv in 1938, Akhiezer became head of the department of Theoretical Physics. A treatise on wave absorption in modulated quasiparticles gave him a habilitation degree in 1941, since when he was full professor at the same place until his death at the age of 89.

With Cyril Sinelnikov and Anton K. Valter he founded the faculty of physics and technology. With Pomeranchuk he studied neutron scattering and plasma physics at the Kurchatov nuclear physics institute in Moscow (1944–52).

Awards
1949 L. I. Mandelshtam Prize of the Academy of Sciences of the Soviet Union
1998 Pomeranchuk Prize

Books

First Russian book on nuclear reactions (1945)

Evolving physical picture of the world (1973 in Russian; updated version 1996 in English)

Physics of elementary particles (1979), Elementary Particles (1986) and Biography of elementary particles (1979). With Mikhail P. Rekalo.
From quanta of light to colour quarks (1993). With Yu. P. Stepanovsky.

References

1911 births
2000 deaths
People from Cherykaw
Academic staff of Kharkiv Polytechnic Institute
Kyiv Polytechnic Institute alumni
Members of the National Academy of Sciences of Ukraine
Academic staff of the School of Physics and Technology of University of Kharkiv
Recipients of the Order of Merit (Ukraine), 2nd class
Recipients of the Order of Merit (Ukraine), 3rd class
Recipients of the Order of the Red Banner of Labour
Belarusian Jews
Jewish physicists
Jewish Ukrainian scientists
Jews from the Russian Empire
Soviet Jews
Ukrainian nuclear physicists
Soviet physicists
Laureates of the State Prize of Ukraine in Science and Technology